The Journal of Econometrics is a scholarly journal in econometrics. It was first published in 1973. Its current managing editors are Serena Ng and Elie Tamer, Torben Andersen and Xiaohong Chen serve as editors.

The journal publishes work dealing with estimation and other methodological aspects of the application of statistical inference to economic data, as well as papers dealing with the application of econometric techniques to economics.

The journal also publishes a supplement to the Journal of Econometrics which is called "Annals of Econometrics". Each issue of the Annals includes a collection of papers on a single topic selected by the editor of the issue.

See also
 Econometrics Journal

References

External links
 Homepage

Economics journals
Econometrics journals
Statistics journals